The Alfenz is a river of Voralberg, Austria.

It originates from the confluence of the Flexenbach and the Rauzbach near Stuben. and flows in western direction. The river's flow created the Klostertal.

Villages near the river include Klösterle and Dalaas.  The S16 expressway runs alongside the river.

The origin of the Alfenz is close to the European watershed. The Alfenz belongs to the Rhine basin, while across the Arlberg to the east the water flows into the Danube. The Alfenz carries rocks from the Northern Limestone Alps that crop out north of the river and the Silvretta Crystalline which crops out in the south.

References

Information about Alfenz near Braz

Rivers of Vorarlberg
Rivers of Austria